3DR is an American company headquartered in Berkeley, California, that makes enterprise drone software for construction, engineering, and mining firms, along with government agencies.

Prior to 2016, the company designed and marketed commercial and recreational unmanned aerial vehicles. They produced consumer drones, ready-to-fly quadcopters for aerial photography and mapping, and fixed-wing UAVs based on the Ardupilot platform. As of September 2016, 3DR and the major open source Ardupilot development community, separated due to disagreements over the license of the open source code which 3DR products are based upon.

The company was co-founded as 3D Robotics in 2009 by author and entrepreneur Chris Anderson and Mexican engineer Jordi Muñoz. The pair met online through the DIY Drones community, which was originally started by Anderson for aerial vehicle enthusiasts.

Products of 3DR
Below is a list of products released by 3DR.

Solo Drone. Released in May 2015 and marketed to the consumer and professional aerial photography market. It is powered by two computers and designed specifically for the GoPro Hero camera. The stated aim of the SOLO drone is ease of both flying the drone and taking professional aerial photos and video.

IRIS+ Drone. Released in September 2014, it was designed for the recreational drone market. With an additional GoPro camera it can capture some aerial photos and videos. This UAV comes ready to fly. It can travel at 40 miles per hour and reach distances of up to 3,280 feet.
 
X8 Quadcopter. Released in November 2014, the X8 quadcopter has a modular design and comes in 2 versions. The X8+ with gimbal and GoPro camera is aimed towards aerial photography and cinematography  The X8-M quadcopter is intended for mapping applications. Both X8 versions feature waypoint navigation technology.

AERO-M Fixed Wing UAV. Released in November 2014, the Aero-M is a fully automated.  It has a mapping platform that creates georeferenced and orthorectified mosaics. This fixed wing drone has a stated flight time of up to 40 minutes and is able to photograph an area of up to 250 acres per flight. The Pix4D software allows for the creation of georeferenced, photogrammetry and orthorectified mosaics from the images. The Aero-M is a commercial UAV with industries such as farming, construction and conservation expected to be benefiting from the creation of geo-referenced maps.

As of March 2016, 3DR announced that they no longer produce any drones. In response to the company stopping to produce hardware, a former employee, interviewed in Forbes magazine in 2016, is quoted as saying "3DR was a $100 million blunder based on ineptitude.”

Flight controllers

In addition to its Site Scan platform, 3DR makes professional flight controllers which are intended for multi-rotor stabilization control of various platforms or heavy payloads in aerial photography, mapping, and personal enjoyment. In addition to the main Pixhawk flight controller model, there is also the less robust APM 2.6 model. Pixhawk is an autopilot system designed by the PX4 open-hardware project and manufactured by 3DR. It features processor and sensor technology from ST Microelectronics and a NuttX real-time operating system. The APM 2.6 is an open source autopilot system. It allows the user to turn fixed rotary wing or multirotor vehicles, including cars and boats, into a fully autonomous vehicle capable of performing programmed GPS missions with waypoints.

Dronecode
3DR is a founding member of the Dronecode Consortium, a non-profit organization governed by the Linux Foundation. The Consortium was formed in 2014 with the goal of using open source Linux for the benefit of users with affordable and more reliable UAV software. Other notable members are Intel, Qualcomm, Parrot SA and Walkera, with funding increasing as new sponsors join.

References

 BBC News: The Mexican immigrant who set up a global drone firm

Electronics companies established in 2009
Companies based in Berkeley, California
Technology companies based in the San Francisco Bay Area
Unmanned aerial vehicle manufacturers
2009 establishments in California